Reiulf Steen (16 August 1933 – 5 June 2014) was a Norwegian author, ambassador and politician with the Norwegian Labour Party. He was active in the Labour Party from 1958 to 1990, serving as deputy party chairman from 1965 to 1975 and chairman from 1975 to 1981. Steen served as Norwegian ambassador to Chile between  1992 and 1996.

Biography
He was born  at Hurum in Buskerud, Norway. His parents were Nils Steen (1889-1941) and  Astrid Karlsen (1899-1986).  The father, who died when Reiulf was  7 years old, had been  president of the Norwegian Chemical Industry Workers' Union  and deputy mayor of the municipality.

Steen was elected leader of the regional Labour Party affiliate at age 14.  He had worked in a factory and as a journalist  for the newspaper Fremtiden  in Drammen  before entering politics in 1958. He rose quickly through the ranks of his party, chairing the Workers' Youth League from 1961 to 1964.

He later served as minister of transportation from 1971 to 1972 and minister of commerce and trade from 1979 to 1981. From 1977 to 1993 he was a member of Parliament, representing the constituencies Oslo and Akershus. He was the vice president of the Socialist International from 1978 to 1983 and chaired its committee on Chile from 1975 to 1990. He maintained a long-standing interest in Latin America and was appointed Norwegian ambassador to Chile in 1992, a tenure that lasted until 1996.

He wrote columns for several of the country's leading newspapers, dealing with both national and international issues.  He was also active in ATTAC and chaired the Norwegian branch of the European Movement (1999–2001), Norsk Folkehjelp (1999–2003) and the Norwegian branch of the Helsinki Committee for Human Rights (1986–1992). In later years, his memoirs and personal recollections related accounts of his own psychiatric problems and difficulties within the Labour Party.

Personal life
Reiulf Steen was married twice. In 1960 he married Lis Fridholm (1936-1985). Their marriage was later dissolved. In 1980 he married Inés Vargas.

He died on 5 June 2014 and was survived by his wife, four children from his first marriage and step-family. Via his step-daughter, he was father-in-law to Labour politician Raymond Johansen, who was Governing Mayor of Oslo. Steen was non-religious.

Bibliography
 Ørnen har landet,  2003 
 Jordskjelv, 2000
 Underveis, 1999
 Beretninger, 1998
 Ideene lever, 1992
 Maktkamp, 1989
 Inés – og det elskede landet, 1988
 Der hjertet banker, 1986

See also
Gro Harlem Brundtland
Trygve Bratteli

References

External links

External links

1933 births
2014 deaths
People from Buskerud
People from Hurum
Politicians from Oslo
Akershus politicians
Members of the Storting
Government ministers of Norway
Ambassadors of Norway to Chile
Norwegian non-fiction writers
Ministers of Transport and Communications of Norway
Ministers of Trade and Shipping of Norway
Leaders of the Labour Party (Norway)
Vice Presidents of the Storting
20th-century Norwegian politicians